Mariam El-Zoheiry (born 16 August 1999) is an Egyptian fencer. She competed in the 2020 Summer Olympics, in team foil.

She competed at the 2019 U17/U20 African Championships,

References

External links 
 Félicitations à Mariam El Zoheiry

1999 births
Living people
Egyptian female foil fencers
Olympic fencers of Egypt
Fencers at the 2020 Summer Olympics